Deulgaon, commonly known as Deulgaon Kaman, is a village located in Bhokardan taluka of Jalna district, in state of Maharashtra, India.

Demographics
As per 2011 census
Deulgaon Kaman has 172 families residing. The village has population of 861.
Out of the population of 861, 447 are males while 414 are females. 
Literacy rate of the village is 69.66%.
Average sex ratio of the village is 926 females to 1000 males. Average sex ratio of Maharashtra state is 929.

Geography, and transport

References

Villages in Jalna district